FYIFV (standing for "Fuck You, I'm Fully Vested") or FYIV is a piece of early Microsoft jargon that has become an urban legend: the claim that employees whose stock options were fully vested (that is, could be exercised) would occasionally wear T-shirts or buttons with the initials "FYIFV" to indicate they were sufficiently financially independent to give their honest opinions and leave any time they wished.

In internal usage at Microsoft, it was meant metaphorically to describe intransigent co-workers. In press usage and popular culture, it was used to imply a predatory business culture reaching even to the programmers.

Despite many third-hand reports of Microsoft employees wearing "FYIFV" buttons or shirts, there is only one report of an actual "FYIFV" T-shirt, worn on the wearer's last day at the company.

Origins of the phrase 

An option allows the holder to buy the stock at a later date for the price at which the option was originally granted. Many Microsoft full-time employees were granted stock options at the start of their employment. The options vested gradually over four and a half years. Because Microsoft's stock price rose significantly between September 1986 and January 2000 and split 8 times in that period, an employee could buy the stock cheap and sell it at a considerable profit, thus reducing or removing their dependence on their Microsoft salary. Many stayed at Microsoft nevertheless because they enjoyed their work.

Adam Barr, author of the book Proudly Serving My Corporate Masters, tracked down a possible origin for the urban legend:

Barr notes also that further options were granted each year, thus an employee could never have been "fully vested."

"FYIFV" in popular culture 

The first third-party note of the term appears to be by Paul Andrews in the Seattle Times in 1989, in the context of Microsoft as a place where hard work and long hours were expected and rewarded:

Andrews used the term again when coauthoring the book Gates with Stephen Manes in 1993.

The quote became more common as Microsoft's fortunes rose, used with the implication that alleged predatory business attitudes reached even to the programmers:

The phrase was also used with the implication that Microsoft employees were motivated only by money, rather than software quality, e.g. in a 2000 Wired article on United States v. Microsoft:

Related phrases

Ken Barnes' Microsoft Lexicon notes also the term "QVD," or "Quietly Vesting Disease": the loss of enthusiasm of an employee as they approach or pass their vesting date.

References

Microsoft culture
English phrases
Initialisms